Väinö Wilhelm Kokko (29 September 1880 – 5 December 1943) was a Finnish politician, born in Oulu. He was at first active in the Young Finnish Party. Kokko was a  Member of the Parliament of Finland from 1936 until his death in 1943, representing the National Coalition Party.

References

1880 births
1943 deaths
People from Oulu
People from Oulu Province (Grand Duchy of Finland)
Young Finnish Party politicians
National Coalition Party politicians
Members of the Parliament of Finland (1936–39)
Members of the Parliament of Finland (1939–45)
Finnish people of World War II